Reproductive toxicity refers to the potential risk from a given chemical, physical or biologic agent to adversely affect  both male and female fertility as well as offspring development. Reproductive toxicants may adversely affect sexual function, ovarian failure, fertility  as well as causing developmental toxicity in the offspring. Lowered effective fertility related to reproductive toxicity relates to both male and female effects alike and is reflected in decreased sperm counts, semen quality and ovarian failure. Infertility is medically defined as a failure of a couple to conceive over the course of one year of unprotected intercourse. As many as 20% of couples experience infertility. Among men, oligospermia is defined as a paucity of viable spermatozoa in the semen, whereas azoospermia refers to the complete of absence of viable spermatozoa in the semen.

The Globally Harmonized System of Classification and Labelling of Chemicals (GHS) separates reproductive toxicity from germ cell mutagenicity and carcinogenicity, even though both these hazards may also affect fertility.

Effects 
Many drugs can affect the human reproductive system. Their effects can be

 desired (hormonal contraception),
 a minor unwanted side effect (many antidepressants) or
 a major public health problem (thalidomide).

However, most studies of reproductive toxicity have focused on occupational or environmental exposure to chemicals and their effects on reproduction. Both consumption of alcohol and tobacco smoking are known to be "toxic for reproduction" in the sense used here.

One well-known group of substances which are toxic for reproduction are teratogens – substances which cause birth defects.  (S)-thalidomide is possibly the most notorious of these.

Another group of substances which have received much attention (and prompted some controversy) as possibly toxic for reproduction are the so-called endocrine disruptors. Endocrine disruptors change how hormones are produced and how they interact with their receptors. Endocrine disruptors are classified as estrogenic, anti-estrogenic, androgenic or anti-androgenic. Each category includes pharmaceutical compounds and environmental compounds. Estrogenic or androgenic compounds will cause the same hormonal responses as the sex steroids (estrogen and testosterone). However anti-estrogenic and anti-andogenic compounds bind to a receptor and block the hormones from binding to their receptors, thus preventing their function. A few examples of the many types of endocrine disruptors are trenbolone (androgenic), flutamide (anti-androgenic), dieththylstilbestrol (estrogenic), Bisphenol A (estrogenic), tributyltin (anti-estrogenic).

However, many substances which are toxic for reproduction do not fall into any of these groups: lead compounds, for example, are considered to be toxic for reproduction given their adverse effects on the normal intellectual and psychomotor development of human babies and children

Examples

Heavy metals

Lead 

Lead, a heavy metal that can exist in both organic and inorganic forms,  is associated with adverse effects on male libido, erectile disfunction,  premature ejaculation and poor sperm quality.  Lead is believed to predominantly affect male reproduction by the disruption of hormones, which reduces the quantity of sperm production in the seminiferous tubules. It has also been proposed that lead causes poor semen quality by increasing reactive oxygen species due to lipid per-oxidation, leading to cellular damage.>

Cadmium 

Cadmium is a heavy metal used in jewelry making, electronics, welding and galvanizing steel. The human route of exposure is primarily inhalational or oral; environmental exposure among the non-occupationally exposed can occur due to exposure to cigarette smoking.  The oral route of exposure can occur due to ingesting  plants and shellfish that have taken up cadmium from water and soil. Exposure to cadmium results in adverse male fertility in terms of decreased spermatogenesis, semen quality, sperm motility and impaired hormonal synthesis. Likewise, exposure to cadmium impairs female fertility in terms of menstrual cycle regularity and reproductive hormonal balance.

Chromium 

Hexavalent chromium ( Cr VI) is used in the electronics industry and for metal plating. Chromium exposure is primarily inhalation or through ingestion.  Human and animal studies show that exposure to hexavalent chromium decreases semen quality and sperm counts.

Mercury 

Elemental mercury( Hg0) is a metal that exists as liquid form at room temperature and is commonly found in thermometers, blood pressure cuffs and dental amalgams. In terms of exposure, the route of absorption is primarily via inhalation through mercury vapor. Data among female dental technicians exposed to mercury vapors have demonstrated decreased fertility among those who were exposed and practiced  poor industrial hygiene while handling dental amalgams. Among female workers in mercury smelting plants an increase in spontaneous abortions has been reported.

Dibromochloropropane 
Dibromochloropropane (DBCP) is used as a pesticide against nematodes in the agricultural industry. DBCP is one of the most  well-known reproductive toxicants known to cause testicular toxicity. Workers in chemical factories exposed to Dibromochloropropane have been shown to develop dose-dependent oligospermia and azoospermia. Additional studies also demonstrated that DBCP-exposed workers in banana and pineapple plantations in central America and other countries also developed oligospermia and azoospermia.  In 1977,  the United States Environmental Protection Agency banned the use of DBCP in agriculture due to its effect on male fertility. Despite being banned from use in agriculture, DBCP is still used as an intermediate in chemical manufacturing as well as a reagent in research.

Ethylene dibromide

Ethylene dibromide (EDB) is a fumigant that was originally used to protect citrus fruits, grains and vegetables from insects. Use of EDB in the United States was banned by the United States Environmental Protection Agency  in 1984, however EDB is still used in the United States as fumigant to treat timber logs for beetles and termites. Likewise, it is still used as an intermediate in chemical manufacturing. Exposure to EDB has been shown to adversely affect male fertility by leading to a decreased sperm counts, decreased numbers of viable sperm and increased abnormal sperm morphology. The primary route of exposure is through inhalation.

Industrial solvents 

Solvent exposure is common among men and women working in industrial settings. Specific solvents including xylene, perchloroethylene,  toluene  and methylene chloride have been shown to be associated with a concurrent elevation in risk for spontaneous abortion

Ionizing radiation 

Ionizing radiation in the form alpha, beta and gamma emissions are well known to adversely affect male fertility. Exposure in the range of 0.1 to1.2 Gy is associated with spermatogonial injury; whereas between 4-6 Gy reductions of sperm counts have been reported.

Radiofrequency electromagnetic fields 

Radio frequency electromagnetic fields, such as those generated from mobile phone devices, have been shown to decrease semen quality production in experimental animal models; however human data is still equivocal at best. The International Association for the Research of Cancer(IARC) classifies radio frequency electromagnetic fields as a group 2B or possibly carcinogenic.

Thalidomide
Thalidomide was once prescribed therapeutically from the 1950s to  early 1960s in Europe as an anti-nausea medication to alleviate morning sickness among pregnant women. While the exact mechanism of action of thalidomide is not known, it is thought to be related to inhibition of angiogenesis through interaction with the insulin like growth factor(IGF-1)  and fibroblast like growth factor 2 (FGF-2) pathways.  In the 1960s, it became apparent that thalidomide altered embryo development and led to limb deformities such as thumb absence, underdevelopment of entire limbs, or phocomelia. Thalidomide may have caused teratogenic effects in over 10,000 babies worldwide.

Endocrine Disrupting Compounds 

Lipid soluble compounds that can cross the cell lipid bilayer and bind cytoplasmic steroid hormone receptors can translocate to the nucleus and act as estrogen agonists. Diethylstilbestrol (DES), a synthetic estrogen, is one such endocrine disruptor and acts as an estrogen agonist. Diethylstilbestrol was used from 1938 to 1971 to prevent spontaneous abortions. Diethylstilbestrol causes cancer and mutations by producing highly reactive metabolites, also causing DNA adducts to form. Exposure to diethylstilbestrol in the womb can cause atypical reproductive tract formation. Specifically, females exposed to diethylstilbestrol in utero during the first trimester have are more likely to develop clear cell vaginal carcinoma, and males have an increased risk of hypospadias.

Bisphenol A

Bisphenol A (BPA)  is used in polycarbonate plastic consumer goods and aluminum can liners.  BPA  is an example of an endocrine disruptor which negatively affects reproductive development by acting as an estrogen mimicker (xenoestrogen) and a likely androgen mimicker. Bisphenol A exposure in fetal female rats leads to mammary gland morphogenesis, increased formation of ovarian tumors, and increased risk of developing mammary gland neoplasia in adult life. In lab animal models, BPA is  considered to be both an ovarian and uterine toxicant as it impairs endometrial proliferation, decreases uterine receptivity and decreases the chances for successful implantation of the embryo  The adverse reproductive toxicological impacts of bisphenol A have been better studied in females than in males.

See also 
 Developmental toxicity
 CLP regulation
 Lead toxicity
 Mercury poisoning

References

Further reading 

 

Chemical safety
Developmental biology